The 2015 Ping An Chinese Football Association Super League was the 12th season since the establishment of the Chinese Super League, the 22nd season of a professional Association football league and the 54th top-tier league season in China.  The league title sponsor was Ping An Insurance. Guangzhou Evergrande Taobao won their fifth consecutive title of the league.

Team changes 
Teams promoted from 2014 China League One
 Chongqing Lifan 
 Shijiazhuang Ever Bright

Teams relegated to 2015 China League One
 Dalian Aerbin
 Harbin Yiteng

Name changes 
 Shanghai Dongya F.C. changed their name to Shanghai SIPG F.C. in December 2014.
 Guangzhou Evergrande F.C. changed their name to Guangzhou Evergrande Taobao F.C. in December 2014.
 Jiangsu Sainty F.C. changed their name to Jiangsu Guoxin-Sainty F.C. in January 2015.

Clubs

Clubs and locations

Managerial changes

Foreign players
The number of foreign players is restricted to five per CSL team, including a slot for a player from AFC countries. A team can use four foreign players on the field in each game, including at least one player from the AFC country. Players from Hong Kong, Macau and Chinese Taipei are deemed to be native players in CSL. However, those players will be treated as foreign Asia players if they participate in any AFC competitions.

Players name in bold indicates the player is registered during the mid-season transfer window.

 Foreign players who left their clubs or were sent to reserve team after first half of the season.
 Jucilei owns Palestine citizenship and was counted as an Asian player in the Chinese Super League
 Avraam Papadopoulos owns Australian citizenship and could play as an Asian player in the Chinese Super League

Hong Kong/Macau/Taiwan outfield players (doesn't count on the foreign or Asian player slot in CSL)

League table

Results

Positions by round

Goalscorers

Top scorers
{| class="wikitable"
|-
!Rank
!Player
!Club
!Total
|-
!rowspan=1|
| Aloísio
|Shandong Luneng Taishan
|
|-
!rowspan=1|
| Ricardo Goulart  
|Guangzhou Evergrande Taobao
|
|-
!rowspan=1|
|  Dejan Damjanović
|Beijing Guoan
|
|-
!rowspan=2|
|  Hernán Barcos
| Tianjin Teda
|rowspan=2 style="text-align:center;" | 15
|-
| Emanuel Gigliotti
|Chongqing Lifan
|-
!rowspan=1|
|  Wu Lei
|Shanghai SIPG
|rowspan=1 style="text-align:center;" | 14
|-
!rowspan=2|
| Gao Lin
|Guangzhou Evergrande Taobao
|rowspan=2 style="text-align:center;" | 13
|-
|  Jacob Mulenga
| Shijiazhuang Ever Bright
|-
!rowspan=2|
| Tobias Hysén
|Shanghai SIPG
|rowspan=2 style="text-align:center;" | 12
|-
|  Anselmo Ramon
|Hangzhou Greentown
|-

Hat-tricks

League attendance

†

†

Awards
The awards of 2015 Chinese Super League were announced on 10 November 2015.
 Chinese Football Association Footballer of the Year:  Ricardo Goulart (Guangzhou Evergrande Taobao)
 Chinese Super League Golden Boot Winner:  Aloísio (Shandong Luneng Taishan)
 Chinese Super League Domestic Golden Boot Award:  Wu Lei (Shanghai SIPG)
 Chinese Football Association Goalkeeper of the Year:  Zeng Cheng (Guangzhou Evergrande Taobao)
 Chinese Football Association Young Player of the Year: Vacant
 Chinese Football Association Manager of the Year:  Luiz Felipe Scolari (Guangzhou Evergrande Taobao)
 Chinese Football Association Referee of the Year:  Tan Hai 
 Chinese Super League Fair Play Award: Shijiazhuang Ever Bright, Hangzhou Greentown, Chongqing Lifan
 Chinese Super League Team of the Year (442):
GK  Zeng Cheng (Guangzhou Evergrande Taobao)
DF  Zhang Linpeng (Guangzhou Evergrande Taobao),  Kim Young-Gwon (Guangzhou Evergrande Taobao),  Feng Xiaoting (Guangzhou Evergrande Taobao),  Xu Yunlong (Beijing Guoan)
MF  Zheng Zhi (Guangzhou Evergrande Taobao),   Huang Bowen (Guangzhou Evergrande Taobao),  Wu Xi (Jiangsu Guoxin Sainty),  Darío Conca (Shanghai SIPG)
FW  Ricardo Goulart (Guangzhou Evergrande Taobao),  Wu Lei (Shanghai SIPG)

References

External links
Current CSL table, and recent results/fixtures at Soccerway
Chinese Super League table at FIFA
Chinese Super League official site 

Chinese Super League seasons
1
China
China